Streptomyces verrucosisporus is a bacterium species from the genus of Streptomyces which has been isolated from marine sediments from the Chumphon Province on Thailand.

See also 
 List of Streptomyces species

References

External links
Type strain of Streptomyces verrucosisporus at BacDive -  the Bacterial Diversity Metadatabase

 

verrucosisporus
Bacteria described in 2016